Cloud suck is a phenomenon commonly known in paragliding, hang gliding, and sailplane flying where pilots experience significant lift due to a thermal under the base of cumulus clouds, especially towering cumulus and cumulonimbus. The vertical extent of a cumulus cloud is a good indicator of the strength of lift beneath it, and the potential for cloud suck.
Cloud suck most commonly occurs in low pressure weather and in humid conditions.

Cloud suck is typically associated with an increase in thermal updraft velocity near cloud base. As a parcel of air lifted in a thermal rises, it also cools, and water vapour will eventually condense to form a cloud if the parcel rises above the lifted condensation level. As the water vapour condenses, it releases its latent heat of vaporization, thereby increasing the buoyancy of the parcel.
The updraft is amplified by this latent heat release. Although the process that causes this amplification happens above cloud base height, the effect is often noticeable as much as 300 m (1,000 feet) below cloud base. In fact, it is this effect below cloud base, not the effect within the cloud, that is generally referred to by pilots as cloud suck. The telltale signs for a pilot climbing in the thermal under a "sucking" cloud are (1) lift strengthening, (2) lift getting smoother, and (3) widening of the thermal.

Paraglider pilots have reported being unable to descend in strong cloud suck, even after bringing their canopies into deep spiral, which would normally result in a rapid vertical descent. Cloud suck is especially dangerous for paraglider pilots, whose maximum speed is less than 30 knots, because storm clouds (Cumulonimbus) can expand and develop rapidly over a large area with accompanying large areas of strong lift.

On 14 February 2007 while practising for a paragliding contest in Australia, Polish-born
German team pilot Ewa Wiśnierska-Cieślewicz was sucked into a cumulonimbus cloud, climbing at up to 20 m per second (4,000 feet per minute)
to an altitude of 9,946 m (32,600 feet). She lost consciousness due to hypoxia, but regained consciousness after 30 minutes to an hour, and landed still covered in ice after a three and a half hour flight.
In the same storm, 42-year-old Chinese paraglider pilot He Zhongpin died after being sucked into the same storm system and struck by lightning at 5900 m (19,000 feet). His body was found the next day  from his last known position prior to entering the cloud.

In 2014 Italian paraglider Paolo Antoniazzi, 66 years old retired Army general, died after being sucked into a thunderstorm.

Compared with hang-gliders and paragliders, sailplanes have much higher top speeds (often over 250 km/h), and can more easily escape powerful cumulonimbus clouds by flying away quickly or by using very effective air brakes. A sailplane also has the added benefit of the pilot being able to put the sailplane into a spin to descend rapidly without over speeding.

Cloud suck is also a concern for powered aircraft but is usually not a lethal hazard, except in extreme weather situations. The USS Shenandoah, the first rigid airship built in the United States, and the first in the world to be inflated with helium, was lost in a cloud suck accident associated with a squall line. At about  the ascent was checked, but the ship began to descend. When halfway to the ground it was hit by another updraft and began to rise rapidly at an even faster rate. Ultimately the keel snapped, and the ship broke up while still more than a mile above the ground. Shenandoah's commanding officer and 13 other officers and men were killed. Twenty-nine members of the crew survived the break-up, although some received serious injuries.

See also 
 Cumulonimbus and aviation

References

External links
 Steve Roti: How to Avoid Cloud Suck article on USHPA website, first published in Paragliding Magazine, January 2001

Cloud and fog physics
Gliding technology
Hang gliding
Paragliding
Weather hazards to aircraft